Victor, Prince Napoléon, titular 3rd Prince of Montfort (Napoléon Victor Jérôme Frédéric Bonaparte; 18 July 1862 – 3 May 1926), was the Bonapartist pretender to the French throne from 1879 until his death in 1926. He was known as Napoléon V by those who supported his claim.

Biography

Early life

He was born in the Palais Royal of Paris during the Second French Empire the son of Napoleon's nephew Prince Napoleon and his wife, Princess Marie Clothilde of Savoy, daughter of Victor Emmanuel II of Italy. He had two younger siblings, Prince Louis (1864–1932) and Princess Maria Letizia Bonaparte (1866–1926), later the Duchess of Aosta. At the time of his birth in 1862, he was third in the line of succession to the throne behind Napoléon, Prince Imperial and his father Prince Napoleon. The Empire came to an end in 1870 with the abdication of the Emperor Napoleon III.

Bonaparte heir
He was appointed head of the house of Bonaparte at the age of 18 in the will of Napoléon Eugène, Prince Imperial, who died in 1879, and so became Napoleon V to his supporters, though his younger brother, Prince Louis, a colonel in the Russian Imperial Guard, was preferred to him by many Bonapartists.  The decision by the Prince Imperial to bypass Prince Victor's father led to a complete breakdown in relations between father and son. In May 1886 the French Republic expelled the princes of the former ruling dynasties and so Prince Victor left France for exile in Belgium.

Dreyfus affair

At the time of the death of President Félix Faure in 1899, during the Dreyfus affair, a number of political factions attempted to take advantage of the disorder and Prince Victor announced to a delegation from the Imperialist committee that he would take action to restore the French Empire when he felt that the time was favourable. In order to achieve this, he announced he would place himself at the head of the movement with his brother, Prince Louis, fighting beside him who he said would be "bringing to the Bonapartist forces his prestige and his military talents as well as his rank in the Russian army". The Duke of Orléans, rival claimant to the throne, also had forces available and they were ready to cross the French frontier at the same time as the Bonapartist forces. In the end the anticipated outbreak in France did not materialise and the French Third Republic survived one of its gravest crises.

Death
Prince Victor died on 3 May 1926 in Brussels with the French author Charles Maurras commenting on Prince Victor's time as pretender saying that he had not offered any new ideas since 1884 and no radical alternatives to republican governments. He was succeeded as the Bonaparte heir by his only son, Prince Louis.

Family
On 10 November/14 November 1910, at Moncalieri, Prince Victor was married to Princess Clémentine of Belgium (1872–1955), daughter of Leopold II of Belgium and Marie Henriette of Austria. They had two children:

Princess Marie Clotilde Eugénie Alberte Laëtitia Généviève Bonaparte (1912–1996); married Comte Serge de Witt and had issue.
Prince Louis Napoléon (1914–1997)

Ancestry

References

External links

 Prince Victor Napoleon

1862 births
1926 deaths
Victor Bonaparte
Victor Bonaparte
Victor Bonaparte
Grand Croix of the Légion d'honneur
2
2
Grand Crosses of the Order of the Star of Romania
Knights Grand Cross of the Order of Saints Maurice and Lazarus
Recipients of the Order of the Crown (Italy)
Burials at the Basilica of Superga